Stresow is a village and a former municipality in the Jerichower Land district, in Saxony-Anhalt, Germany. Since 1 September 2010, it is part of the town Möckern.

Geography
Stresow is located about 10 km east of Burg bei Magdeburg. It was part of the Verwaltungsgemeinschaft Möckern-Loburg-Fläming.

Highways
Bundesstraße 1 that ties Magdeburg with Berlin, lays only 9.5 km north of the town.
Bundesautobahn 2 exit 75 can be reached in only 5.5 km South East of the town.

References

Former municipalities in Saxony-Anhalt
Möckern